New relationship energy (or NRE) refers to a state of mind experienced at the beginning of sexual and romantic relationships, typically involving heightened emotional and sexual feelings and excitement. NRE begins with the earliest attractions, may grow into full force when mutuality is established, and can fade over months or years. The term indicates contrast to those feelings aroused in an "old" or ongoing relationship.

The term originated in the Usenet postings of Zhahai Stewart in the 1980s and more widely presented in 1993. This concept is similar to that of limerence, which was first defined in 1979.

While the dynamics described by NRE apply to all relationships, the term is particularly prevalent in the polyamorous community, as people with multiple concurrent intimate relationships experience new relationship energy alongside more settled ongoing relationships. Adjusting to and compensating for the contrast in effect and excitement between the new and old relationships is considered an important factor in successfully balancing those relationships. Describing the process in a positive way can help old partners deal with feelings of jealousy towards the new partner, as well as helping the person with a new partner be more understanding and conscious of maintaining their existing relationships.

New relationship energy is generally considered desirable, perhaps nearly indispensable in forming deep emotional bonds, but it can also temporarily distort perceptions and judgments and this must be taken into account. These distortions of perception do not automatically imply that the attraction is unreal or will not last (indeed most lasting romantic bonds do begin with NRE, although this does not mean that most relationships that begin with NRE would lead to lasting romantic bonds because of the complications that can come with the end of NRE), only that the magnitude of these positive feelings is greater than it is likely to be later, and some potential interpersonal problems may seem smaller than they will later become. Caution rather than avoidance or suppression is usually suggested in dealing with NRE.

A less-common variant is new relationship chemistry, which is conceptually similar to NRE except with emphasis explicitly limited to the brain chemistry involved in creating the euphoric feelings, rather than actions and rationalized feelings involved with NRE.

See also
 Limerence, the state of mind which arises from romantic attraction
 Infatuation
 Obsessive love
 Puppy love

References

External links
 New Relationship Energy FAQ
 NRE (New Relationship Energy)
 National Geographic Magazine, Feb 2006: "Love – the Chemical Reaction".

Love
Interpersonal relationships
Polyamory
Polyamorous terminology